ARM Oaxaca (PO-161) is the lead ship of the  of patrol vessels, constructed by and for the Mexican Navy.

Primary armament is a single OTO Melara 76 mm naval gun, with a pair of OTO Melara 12.7 mm remote controlled naval turret Mod. 517 with M2 12.7mm machine guns on each side, and an Oto Melara single 30/SAFS 30 mm cannon aft.

A helipad on the afterdeck has handling capabilities for a variety of helicopters, such as the Panther, Fennec, or the Bolkow Bo 105 Super-5.

UNITAS Gold
ARM Oaxaca participated in UNITAS Gold from 25 April 2009 to 5 May 2009. The ships main guns were tested as well as a BO-105 helicopter from the ship during the sinking of the ex-USS Conolly (DD-975) 29 April. This was the first time Mexico participated in UNITAS Gold, sending ARM Oaxaca and ARM Mina. The ships also practiced fire drills and other exercises.

References

External links

Oaxaca-class patrol vessels
2003 ships